The Tenga rail disaster  of May 25, 2002 occurred at Tenga 40 km north-west from Maputo, Mozambique causing 192 deaths and 167 injured.

Overview 
The train comprised carriages containing 600 people and several wagons loaded with South African cement. The carriages were uncoupled about 5 km from Tenga, possibly as part of a manoeuvre by the train crew. The carriages then rolled down the line into Tenga, and crashed into the stationary rail wagons loaded with cement from the train which were coupled to the locomotive.

Three days of mourning were declared by then President of Mozambique Joaquim Chissano.

Cause 
The crash was blamed on human error and a manoeuvre that went wrong.  It appears that the crew were intending to go back and pick up the carriages.   The worst casualties were in the first two carriages.  Hence it appears that the carriages crashed into part of the same train, not a following train.

Similar accidents 
Similar accidents can help explain the current one.

  Armagh rail disaster (1889)
  Chapel-en-le-Frith (1957)
  Gare de Lyon train accident (1988)
  Igandu train disaster (2002)

See also 
 Railway stations in Mozambique

References 

2002 disasters in Africa
Railway accidents in 2002
Railway accidents and incidents in Mozambique
Runaway train disasters
May 2002 events in Africa